In photometry, the lumen second (lm⋅s) is the unit of luminous energy in the International System of Units (SI). It is based on the lumen, the SI unit of luminous flux, and the second, the SI base unit of time.

The lumen second is sometimes called the talbot (symbol T). This name was coined in 1937 by the Committee on Colorimetry, Optical Society of America, in honor of the early photographer William Fox Talbot. The talbot is exactly equal to the lumen second:
1 T = 1 lm⋅s

The use of the symbol T for talbots conflicts with T as the symbol for the tesla, the SI unit of magnetic flux density.

The photometric unit lumerg or lumberg, proposed by the Committee on Colorimetry in 1937, correlates with the old CGS unit erg in the same way that the lumen second correlates with the radiometric unit joule, so that .

References

Units of luminous energy
SI derived units